Violeta Isfel (born Violeta Isfel Garma García on June 11, 1985 in Mexico City, D.F., Mexico), is a Mexican actress, singer and model. She played Antonella in the telenovela Atrévete a soñar, and has performed in further telenovelas such as Lola, érase una vez, Peregrina, Las tontas no van al cielo, and Una familia con suerte.

Filmography

Television

Film

Awards and nominations

Premios TVyNovelas

Kids Choice Awards México

References

External links

1985 births
Living people
Mexican child actresses
Mexican telenovela actresses
Mexican television actresses
Mexican film actresses
Mexican stage actresses
20th-century Mexican actresses
21st-century Mexican actresses
Actresses from Mexico City
Singers from Mexico City
People from Mexico City
21st-century Mexican singers
21st-century Mexican women singers